FAM76A is a protein that in Homo sapiens is encoded by the FAM76A gene. Notable structural characteristics of FAM76A include an 83 amino acid coiled coil domain as well as a four amino acid poly-serine compositional bias. FAM76A is conserved in most chordates but it is not found in other deuterostrome phlya such as echinodermata, hemichordata, or xenacoelomorpha—suggesting that FAM76A arose sometime after chordates in the evolutionary lineage. Furthermore, FAM76A is not found in fungi, plants, archaea, or bacteria. FAM76A is predicted to localize to the nucleus and may play a role in regulating transcription.

Gene

Location 
FAM76A is located on the (+) strand of the short arm of chromosome 1 (1p35.3), with the genomic sequence starting at 27725979 and ending at 27762915. The coding region is made up of 3462 base pairs and is translated into 341 amino acids.

Gene neighborhood
Genes that flank FAM76A on the telomeric side include IFI6, CHMP1AP1, and RPEP3, while genes that flank FAM76A on the centromeric side include STX12, PPP1R8, and L0C105376894.

Common aliases 
In Caenorhabditis elegans, FAM76A is referred to as K04F10.7. Outside of this, FAM76A does not have any significant alternative names.

mRNA
In Homo sapiens, the FAM76A gene produces 9 different mRNAs, 7 of which are alternatively spliced and 2 of which are unspliced. Of the alternatively spliced mRNAs, isoform 1 is the longest variant of the gene and is the subject of this article.

Protein

General properties
The molecular weight of FAM76A is 38.4 kDa, making it possible for this protein to diffuse through nuclear pores. The isoelectric point is 9.28. FAM76A does not have any significant positive, negative, or mixed charge clusters. In addition, FAM76A does not have any predicted hydrophobic or transmembrane segments, suggesting that this protein is not found within the cell membrane.

Composition 
The amino acid composition of FAM76A protein showed amino acid frequencies within 1.5% of that of normal human proteins for all but cysteine, valine, and lysine. Cysteine and lysine have higher frequencies compared to a normal Homo sapiens protein, while valine has a lower frequency compared to a normal Homo sapiens protein. These same amino acid frequency differences are seen in FAM76A orthologs such as Gallus gallus (H. sapiens sequence identity 84%), Serinus canaria (H. sapiens sequence identity 77%), and Crassostrea gigas (H. sapiens sequence identity 57%).

Domains and motifs

NCBI conserved domains search identified an uncharacterized conserved protein (YqiK) that contains the Band7/PHB/SPFH domain, whose function is unknown and is conserved in various species ranging from humans to bacteria. In Homo sapiens, the Band7/PHB/SPFH domain spans from amino acids 252-326. The molecular weight of this domain is 8.9 kDa, and it has an isoelectric point of 9.23. The Band7/PHB/SPFH domain does not have any amino acids frequency composition that differs from a normal Homo sapiens protein. This domain is yet to be assigned to any domain superfamily.

Secondary structure

FAM76A is predicted to only have alpha helices. In total, there are 17 alpha helices predicted, the longest of which contains the Band7/PHB/SPFH domain. From this, only 8 alpha helices are located within conserved regions of FAM76A (see conceptual translation).

Tertiary/quaternary structure
FAM76A contains a coiled-coil domain, which is located within the Band7/PHB/SPFH domain. No significant ligand-binding sites or active sites were predicted from I-TASSER. There is no evidence to suggest that FAM76A interacts with other proteins to form a quaternary structure.

Sub-cellular localization
The protein subcellular localization prediction tool, PSORT II, predicts FAM76A to be located within the nucleus. This prediction is observed in orthologs such as Gallus gallus and Callorhinchus milii. Further evidence for FAM76A localizing to the nucleus is provided by the presence of a nuclear localization signal.

Expression 
According to NCBI Geo Profile, FAM76A is expressed in Homo sapiens parathyroid, lymph node, esophagus, and bone marrow tissue. Developmental stages where FAM76A expression is detected include the embryoid body, fetus, and adult.

Brain atlas
Allen human brain atlas predictions for FAM76A expression are depicted below. FAM76A appears to have higher expression within the cerebral cortex and lower expression in parts of the reptilian brain such as the pontine tegmentum (see expression table for further details).

Experimental data
Select data from three experiments involving FAM76A are shown below. In one experiment, CLDN1 over-expression in lung adenocarcinoma cells decreased FAM76A expression. In another experiment, androgen insensitive prostate cancer cells were shown to have reduced expression of FAM76A compared to androgen sensitive cells. Another experiment demonstrated that metaphase II oocyte cells were shown to have more expression of FAM76A compared to control cells.

Regulation of expression

Post-translational modifications
FAM76A is predicted to undergo a variety of post-translational modifications. Post-translational modifications found within conserved regions include 7 phosphorylation sites, 2 sumoylation sites, and 1 nuclear localization signal. These modifications indicate that FAM76A is localized to the nucleus. Refer to conceptual translation for a visual representation of the aforementioned modifications.

Promoter 
Genomatrix's ElDorado program predicts a promoter for FAM76A that is named GXP_71042 and is 679 base pairs. It is located on chromosome 1, starting at 27725479 and ending at 27726157. GXP_71042 overlaps with the start of the coding sequence of FAM76A. There are several transcription factors that bind to this promoter. Many of the transcription factors that bind to the promoter region of FAM76A have function dealing with blood cells, the immune system, and leukocytes—perhaps suggesting that FAM76A is involved in immune function. It would also appear that the most common matrix families include C2H2 zinc fingers and myeloid zinc fingers, suggesting that these matrix families may be heavily involved in FAM76A transcription.

RNA binding proteins
Common RNA binding proteins within the 3’ UTR of FAM76A include PABPC1, ELAVL1, and PUM2—each with predicted binding frequencies of 32, 18, and 16 times, respectively.

Interacting proteins
FAM76A was found to have a physical interaction with ELAVL1. The interaction was detected by immunoprecipitation by Abdelmohsen et al., 2009. ELAVL1 is involved in regulating gene expression.

Homology/evolution

Paralogs 
FAM76B is a paralog of FAM76A. It is estimated that FAM76A and FAM76B diverged from each other around 17.5 MYA. Structural similarities that are conserved between FAM76A/B include a coiled coil domain as well as a poly serine compositional bias. FAM76A and FAM76B both exhibit high expression in tissues such as lymph node, whole blood, testis, ovary, brain, kidney, liver, and lung. FAM76B has about 62% sequence identity with FAM76A.

Orthologs 

Shown here is a table of a select number of orthologs for Homo sapiens FAM76A. The table includes closely, intermediately, and distantly related orthologs. Mammals are shown to have greater similarity, while aquatic vertebrates such as actinopterygii/chondrichthyes have lesser similarity. Orthologs of Homo sapiens protein FAM76A are listed above in descending order of date of divergence and then by sequence identity.

Evolution 
FAM76A appears to have a moderate rate of mutation when compared to fibrinogen (fast mutating) and cytochrome c (slow mutating). This suggests that FAM76A has been at least somewhat resistant to mutation during the course of evolution.

Clinical significance

Disease association
FAM76A expression is highest in adrenal tumors, esophageal tumors, and soft tissue/muscle tissue tumors. Copy number gain/loss of FAM76A—along with neighboring genes—has shown to produce detrimental phenotypes. In one case report, a patient with a copy number gain from 1p36.11-34.2 was shown to have developmental delays. Another patient, who had a copy number gain from 1p36.1-35, showed similar delays. In another case report, a patient with a copy number loss of 1p35.3, the exact location of FAM76A, developed macrocephaly.

Multiple sequence alignment (MSA)
The MSA, shown below and generated with Biology Workbench CLUSTALW, arranges orthologs by the first letter of genus and then the first two letters of species. There are 3 domains that are highly conserved across orthologs. Two of these domains have an unknown function, while the third domain is a coiled-coil domain. Conservation of these regions was traced back to Cryptosporidium parvum Iowa II, which diverged from Homo sapiens 1724.7 MYA. Conserved region 1 contains mostly polar amino acids; conserved region 2 contains both polar and non-polar amino acids; and the coiled-coil domain contains mostly polar amino acids.

References

Further reading 

 
 

Human proteins